Tahibacter  is a genus of Pseudomonadota from the family of Rhodanobacteraceae.

References

Further reading 
 
 

Xanthomonadales
Bacteria genera